The Fall of the Curtain (Italian:Lisa Fleuron) is a 1920 Italian silent film directed by Roberto Roberti and starring Francesca Bertini.

Cast
 Francesca Bertini
 Luigi Cigoli 
 Mina D'Orvella 
 Isabel De Lizaso 
 Raoul Maillard
 Augusto Poggioli 
 Sandro Salvini

References

Bibliography
 Goble, Alan. The Complete Index to Literary Sources in Film. Walter de Gruyter, 1999.

External links

1920 films
1920s Italian-language films
Films directed by Roberto Roberti
Italian silent feature films
Italian black-and-white films